Carbonate compensation depth (CCD) is the depth in the oceans below which the rate of supply of calcite (calcium carbonate) lags behind the rate of solvation, such that no calcite is preserved. Shells of animals therefore dissolve  and carbonate particles may not accumulate in the sediments on the sea floor below this depth. Aragonite compensation depth (hence ACD) describes the same behaviour in reference to aragonitic carbonates. Aragonite is more soluble than calcite, so the aragonite compensation depth is generally shallower than the calcite compensation depth.

Overview

As shown in the diagram, biogenic calcium carbonate (CaCO3) tests are produced in the photic zone of the oceans (green circles). Upon death, those tests escaping dissolution near the surface, settle along with clays materials. In seawater, a dissolution boundary is formed as a result of temperature, pressure, and depth, and is known as the saturation horizon. Above the saturation horizon, waters are supersaturated and CaCO3 tests are largely preserved. Below the saturation, waters are undersaturated because of increasing solubility with depth and the release of CO2 from organic matter decay and CaCO3 will dissolve. Dissolution occurs primarily at the sediment surface as the sinking velocity of debris is rapid (broad white arrows). At the carbonate compensation depth, the rate of dissolution exactly matches rate of supply of CaCO3 from above. At steady state this carbonate compensation depth is similar to the snowline (the first depth where carbonate poor sediments occur). The lysocline is the depth interval between the saturation and carbonate compensation depth.

Solubility of carbonate
Calcium carbonate is essentially insoluble in sea surface waters today. Shells of dead calcareous plankton sinking to deeper waters are practically unaltered until reaching the lysocline, the point about 3.5 km deep past which the solubility increases dramatically with depth and pressure. By the time the CCD is reached all calcium carbonate has dissolved according to this equation:
CaCO3 + CO2 + H2O <=> Ca^2+ (aq) + 2HCO_3^- (aq)

Calcareous plankton and sediment particles can be found in the water column above the CCD. If the sea bed is above the CCD, bottom sediments can consist of calcareous sediments called calcareous ooze, which is essentially a type of limestone or chalk. If the exposed sea bed is below the CCD tiny shells of CaCO3 will dissolve before reaching this level, preventing deposition of carbonate sediment. As the sea floor spreads, thermal subsidence of the plate, which has the effect of increasing depth, may bring the carbonate layer below the CCD; the carbonate layer may be prevented from chemically interacting with the sea water by overlying sediments such as a layer of siliceous ooze or abyssal clay deposited on top of the carbonate layer.

Variations in value of the CCD 

The exact value of the CCD depends on the solubility of calcium carbonate which is determined by temperature, pressure and the chemical composition of the water – in particular the amount of dissolved  in the water. Calcium carbonate is more soluble at lower temperatures and at higher pressures. It is also more soluble if the concentration of dissolved  is higher. Adding a reactant to the above chemical equation pushes the equilibrium towards the right producing more products: Ca2+ and HCO3−, and consuming more reactants  and calcium carbonate according to Le Chatelier's principle.

At the present time the CCD in the Pacific Ocean is about 4200–4500 metres except beneath the equatorial upwelling zone, where the CCD is about 5000 m. In the temperate and tropical Atlantic Ocean the CCD is at approximately 5000 m. In the Indian Ocean it is intermediate between the Atlantic and the Pacific at approximately 4300 meters. The variation in the depth of the CCD largely results from the length of time since the bottom water has been exposed to the surface; this is called the "age" of the water mass. Thermohaline circulation determines the relative ages of the water in these basins. Because organic material, such as fecal pellets from copepods, sink from the surface waters into deeper water, deep water masses tend to accumulate dissolved carbon dioxide as they age. The CCD is relatively shallow in high latitudes with the exception of the North Atlantic and regions of Southern Ocean where downwelling occurs. This downwelling brings young, surface water with relatively low concentrations of carbon dioxide into the deep ocean, depressing the CCD.

In the geological past the depth of the CCD has shown significant variation. In the Cretaceous through to the Eocene the CCD was much shallower globally than it is today; due to intense volcanic activity during this period atmospheric  concentrations were much higher. This greater pressure of atmospheric  leads to increased dissolved  in the ocean mixed surface layer. This effect was somewhat moderated by the deep oceans' elevated temperatures during this period. In the late Eocene the transition from a greenhouse to an icehouse Earth coincided with a deepened CCD.

John Murray investigated and experimented on the dissolution of calcium carbonate and was first to identify the carbonate compensation depth in oceans.

Climate change impacts 

Ocean acidification, which is also caused by increasing carbon dioxide concentrations in the atmosphere, will increase such dissolution and shallow the carbonate compensation depth on timescales of tens to hundreds of years.

Sedimentary ooze 

On the sea floors above the carbonate compensation depth, the most commonly found ooze is calcareous ooze; on the sea floors below the carbonate compensation depth, the most commonly found ooze is siliceous ooze. While calcareous ooze mostly consists of Rhizaria, siliceous ooze mostly consists of Radiolaria and Diatom.

See also
 Carbonate pump
 Lysocline
 Ocean acidification

References 

Oceanography